Navagraha is a 2008 Indian Kannada language heist thriller film directed by Dinakar Thoogudeepa and A.V Chinthan. The film stars Darshan and Sharmila Mandre.

Plot 
The film begins with a meeting between crime syndicates across the global world who propose to steal the Ambari in Mysore Palace which is auctioned for 500 million by the syndicate. Iqbal proposes that his expert thief/henchman Jaggu can handle this, but Jaggu is in prison after he successfully completes a bank heist. Diwan bails Jaggu, who is taken to Iqbal by Jaggu's sister Gowri and his friend Kumbhi (Gowri's love interest). Iqbal makes a deal with Jaggu to steal the Ambari from the Mysore Palace and deliver it in Mangalore Harbour in exchange for 20 million. Later at home, Kumbhi is hesitant to take up the operation, but relents after Gowri's suggestion.

Kumbhi ask Jaggu about a heist team for the operation, Jaggu proposes another 4 persons for the operation and had met them in prison: mining expert Tony, duplicate expert and friends Nagi and Shetty, tactical getaway driver and mechanic Gende. Jaggu calls them and reveals about the heist, but they denies stating that Jamboo Savari is approaching and the Ambari is believed to protected by the Goddess Chamundeshwari. The gang relents after their financial difficulties are increasing day by day. They travel to Mysore and reach their hideout. Kiran, who is Jaggu's old member brings Vicky to join the gang, who accepts due to his love for Kiran. Vicky is actually the son of Ramanna, who is the Chief Security guard of Mysore Palace, where he gets information about three tunnels in which one of the tunnels leads to Simhagarjane where the Ambari will be worshipped on Ayudha Puja.

Tony and Vicky check the Rani Bungalow tunnel where they find it is the shortest snd safe route. Jaggu and the gang start their heist preparations. The gang crosses the tunnel and whisk away Ambari from Simhagarjane replacing it with a fake one and escape by using a local bus disguised as KSRTC bus where they start their destination from Mysore to Mangalore Harbour. Meanwhile, The Mysore city police department appoints ACP Bhagath as the in-charge of the Mysore Palace Security along with Vicky's best friend SI Pratap. When the Ayudha Puja is commencing, Bhagath deduce that Ambari is stolen from the palace and begins the investigation.

Bhagath learns from a sculptor about Jaggu's plan of creating replicas of Ambari and deduce that is trying to confuse the police department. Bhagat forms a plan informing that 6 replicas of Ambari contains RDX and tells them to arrest the culprits whoever has one of the replicas. Jaggu and the gang reach the border where he deduce Bhagath's plan and takes an alternate route and also kills two officers when they become suspicious. Bhagath deduce that Vicky is also involved in the heist and decide to search him. While travelling, Kumbhi reveals to Jaggu that he listened to Jaggu's conversation with Iqbal in which Jaggu plans to deliver Ambari and double-cross others by killing them, where he also reveals that he changed the account password in which Iqbal will send the money.

They spend time in a hill when the bus's wheel is punctured. Kumbhi gives a pendrive to Gowri which contains the heist plan, password and bank account. Jaggu kills Kumbhi and knocks Gowri, thus gaining the pendrive and decide to continue their journey. Vicky finds that Kiran, who is Jaggu's love interest, has been using him all along as she learnt that his father knows about the Mysore Palace. Devastated about Kumbhi's death, Gowri commits suicide by jumping from the bus to a river. Deducing that Jaggu is not trustworthy as the latter didn't felt guilty about losing Gowri, Tony tells Gende to stop the bus by holding him at gunpoint where a Mexican standoff ensues between the gang. Vicky receives Jaggu's handset and calls Prathap where he reveals Ambari's location, only to held at gunpoint by Kiran.

The bus stops at a dense ground and a fight ensues where Shetty, Gende, Tony, Nagi and Kiran are killed. Jaggu boards the bus and thrashes Vicky, but leaves him and continues the journey. At a hillway, Bhagat and his team arrive and shoots the bus where it gets stuck at a bridge and a fight ensues where Jaggu gets shot. Bhagath ties the rope at Ambari and is taken by the police chopper. Bhagath grabs Vicky where they jump from the bus. The bus falls down, along with Jaggu which leads to Jaggu's death. At Vijayadashami festival, The Ambari is reinstated and the Jamboo Savari is celebrated with great pomp, where Vicky decides to work hard in future.

Cast
Darshan as Jaggu
Sharmila Mandre as Kiran
 Giri Dinesh as Shetty
 Dharma Keerthiraj as Vicky
 Vinod Prabhakar as Tony
 Srujan Lokesh as Gende
 Tharun Kishore Sudhir as Kumbhi
 Varsha as Gowri 
 Nagendra Urs as Naagi
 Sourav as ACP Bhagat
 Kuri Prathap as Sub-inspector Prathap
 Mohan Juneja as Nagi and Shetty's client
 Malavalli Saikrishna 
 Vikram Udaykumar as Police Commissioner 
 Ravindranath 
 Krishne Gowda 
 Bank Suresh 
 Vinod Varadaraj
 Ravi Varma

Soundtrack

Reception

Critical response 

R G Vijayasarathy of Rediff.com scored the film at 2 out of 5 stars and wrote "Kudos to Darshan for accepting a role that has negative shades to it though he is a popular hero. It is appreciable that he has let the other not so well known heroes to take the limelight. Darshan, no doubt is lively. Among the others, it is Dharma who is excellent in his performance. Vinod Prabhakar and Srujan Lokesh have also excelled. Sharmila Mandre impresses in her brief role. Krishna Kumar's camera work is good. Watch it once". A critic from Bangalore Mirror wrote "A few inconsistencies have to be ignored, if you want to enjoy the film. Not all the seven sons are actors, and it shows. Inspite of these, Navagraha is watchable just for the novelty it brings to the monotony in Kannada films of late". A critic from The New Indian Express wrote "As far as Darshan’s performance is concerned, his fans might not like it. The reason is that his role is negative. He dies in the climax. There is no scope for him to run around trees. Also the film does not have a strong villain".

See also
 Maha Prachandaru - a 1981 Kannada heist film about the theft of an idol from a temple.

References

External links 
 

2008 films
2000s Kannada-language films
Indian heist films
Films set in Bangalore
Films scored by V. Harikrishna
Films directed by Dinakar Thoogudeepa